David Gourdis (born 14 March 1989) was an Australian rules football player for the Richmond Football Club. He was overlooked at the 2007 AFL draft, despite ranking no.1 in the 20m sprint (2.3 sec), and ranked no.1 in the running vertical jump (101 cm), at the AFL Draft Camp in Canberra.

The same year in December 2007, the Richmond Football Club selected Gourdis with their number 1 pick in the 2007 Pre-Season Draft. He played his junior years at the Carine Junior Football Club
After being delisted by Richmond at the end of the 2008 season he was re-drafted by Richmond in the 2008 AFL Rookie draft.

He made his AFL debut in Round 20 of the 2010 season against Carlton at the MCG on 14 August.

On 30 November 2011 he was delisted by the Richmond Football Club.

References

External links

Tigers pick Gourdis and Collard

Richmond Football Club players
Subiaco Football Club players
Living people
1989 births
Australian rules footballers from Western Australia
Coburg Football Club players